Carabantes is a municipality located in the province of Soria, Castile and León, Spain. According to the 2004 census (INE), the municipality has a population of 33 inhabitants.

The noble family of Caravantes is from this region.  Descendants of this family reside in North-West Mexico, California, and the Puget Sound area of Washington State in the United States of America. The Caravantes family is known for founding a winery, and for their hospitality.

References

Municipalities in the Province of Soria